Samuel P. Spiegel (November 11, 1901December 31, 1985) was an American independent film producer born in the Galician area of Austria-Hungary. Financially responsible for some of the most critically acclaimed motion pictures of the 20th century, Spiegel produced films that won the Academy Award for Best Picture three times, a Hollywood first for a sole independent producer.

Early life 
Spiegel was born to a German-speaking Jewish family in Jarosław, Galicia, Austria-Hungary (until 1772 in Polish Crown, now in Poland). His parents were Regina and Simon Spiegel, a tobacco wholesaler. He received his education at the University of Vienna. He had an older brother, Shalom Spiegel (1899-c. 1984), who was a professor of medieval Hebrew poetry.

Career 
Spiegel worked briefly in Hollywood in 1927 following a stint serving with Hashomer Hatzair in Palestine. He then went to Berlin to produce German and French adaptations of Universal films. In 1933 he fled Germany following the election of the Nazi party and increased antisemitism. As an independent producer, Spiegel helped produce a number of European films.

In 1938, he emigrated to Mexico and subsequently the United States.

Between 1935 and 1954, Spiegel billed himself as S. P. Eagle; after that he used his real name. His nickname was the "velvet octopus" after his propensity to entwine himself with women in the back of taxis and manage Hollywood with a velvet touch according to Billy Wilder. He loved London and admired the British, as is reflected in his films The Bridge on the River Kwai (1957) and Lawrence of Arabia (1962), both of which won seven Academy Awards including Best Picture. Starting with the 1951 film The African Queen, he produced films through his British-based production company Horizon Pictures.

In a review in Variety of Natasha Fraser-Cavassoni's biography of Spiegel, Wendy Smith notes: "It's all here: the sleazy financial maneuvers and creepy taste for underage girls that make Spiegel a decidedly flawed protagonist, as well as the wit, sophistication, and Old World charm that make him a titanic figure the likes of which the movie industry will not see again"

Awards 
Spiegel won the Academy Award for Best Picture for Elia Kazan's On the Waterfront as well as for The Bridge on the River Kwai (1957) and Lawrence of Arabia (1962), both directed by Briton David Lean. In 1963, he was awarded the Irving Thalberg Memorial Award at that year's Academy Awards for his many contributions to cinema.

Sexual misconduct allegations 
American actress Theresa Russell alleged that she was sexually propositioned by Spiegel during her first casting session for his 1976 film The Last Tycoon. In another interview, Russell recalled: "I was 16 years old and still living at home, and he took me to the Bistro and tried to stick his tongue down my throat." After she refused to sign a contract with Spiegel, Russell "was completely left out of the publicity for The Last Tycoon, and Spiegel threatened that he would prevent Russell from working again in Hollywood.

Personal life 
Spiegel maintained a connection with Israel throughout his life, particularly with such personalities as Golda Meir, Ariel Sharon, Jerusalem Foundation president Ruth Cheshin (wife of Mishael Cheshin), and his close friend, then Jerusalem Mayor Teddy Kollek. Spiegel also contributed to various Zionist causes. He spoke eight languages fluently: English, French, German, Italian, Spanish, Polish, Hebrew and Yiddish.

Legacy 
Spiegel's heirs and the administrators of his estate, son Adam Spiegel, daughter Alisa Freedman, niece Judge Raya Dreben, and Adv. David Bottoms, decided to transfer Spiegel's impressive art collection to the Israel Museum in Jerusalem. Since 1996, they have made an annual contribution, through the Jerusalem Foundation, to the film school in Jerusalem bearing his name since that time – the Sam Spiegel Film and Television School, Jerusalem. This annual contribution is the largest in the history of Israeli cinema. 

In 2005, the 15th anniversary of the establishment of the Sam Spiegel Film and Television School, the Jerusalem Municipality complied with a request from the school's founder-director Renen Schorr to mark the occasion by declaring the lane in the Talpiot industrial section where the school is located "The Sam Spiegel Alley."  The street sign's inscription: "Sam Spiegel – Jewish-American Film Producer and Oscar-winner. Pioneer. Lover of Zion."

Filmography as producer 

 Invisible Opponent (1933)
 The Oil Sharks (1933)
 Mariage à responsabilité limitée (1933)
 The Invader (1935) (co-producer)
 Derrière la façade (1939)
 Tales of Manhattan (1942) (as S. P. Eagle)
 The Stranger (1946) (as S. P. Eagle)
 We Were Strangers (1949) (as S. P. Eagle)
 When I Grow Up (1951) (as S. P. Eagle)
 The Prowler (1951) (as S. P. Eagle)
 The African Queen (1951) (as S. P. Eagle)
 Melba (1953)
 On the Waterfront (1954)
 The Strange One (1957)
 The Bridge on the River Kwai (1957)
 Suddenly, Last Summer (1959)
 Lawrence of Arabia (1962)
 The Chase (1966)
 The Night of the Generals (1967)
 The Happening (1967)
 Nicholas and Alexandra (1971)
 The Last Tycoon (1976)
 Betrayal (1983)

References

External links 

The Making of Lawrence of Arabia, Digitised BAFTA Journal, Winter 1962-3
 Sam Spiegel Film & Television School
 

1901 births
1985 deaths
20th-century American businesspeople
People from Jarosław
Austro-Hungarian Jews
People from the Kingdom of Galicia and Lodomeria
Jews from Galicia (Eastern Europe)
American entertainment industry businesspeople
American film producers
American people of Polish-Jewish descent
American people of German-Jewish descent
Producers who won the Best Picture Academy Award
BAFTA fellows
Golden Globe Award-winning producers
Sexual assaults in the United States
Jewish emigrants from Nazi Germany to the United States
University of Vienna alumni
Jewish film people